Viktor Bychkov may refer to
Viktor Bychkov (actor) (born 1954), Russian actor
Viktor Bychkov (athlete) (born 1938), Russian sprinter
Viktor Bychkov (philosopher) (born 1942), Russian philosopher